BPD may refer to:
 Borderline personality disorder
 Bipolar disorder
 Brief psychotic disorder

Medical
 Biliopancreatic diversion
 Bronchopulmonary dysplasia

Organizations
 Bharat Punarnirman Dal, a national political party of India
 Birla Institute of Technology and Science, Pilani – Dubai Campus
 Bombrini-Parodi-Delfino, an Italian chemical firm that existed from 1912 to 1968
 Brunei Prison Department

Law enforcement
 Bakersfield Police Department
 Baltimore Police Department
 Bellevue Police Department (Washington)
 Berkeley Police Department
 Binghamton Police Department
 Boise Police Department
 Boston Police Department
 Bradenton Police Department
 Brea Police Department

Other uses
 BPD (car), British cyclecar manufactured in 1913
 Bank Pembangunan Daerah, a term for Indonesian regional development banks
 Barrel per day, a unit of oil production rate commonly used in a regions or countries using the oil barrel of 42 US gallons
 Biocidal Products Directive, European Union directive 98/8/EC
 Building Performance Database, a database maintained by the Lawrence Berkeley National Laboratory for the US Department of Energy
 Business Process Diagram, the process diagram used in Business Process Model and Notation